Paul de Keyser may refer to:

Paul De Keyser (born 1957), Belgian racing cyclist
Paul de Keyser (violinist) (born 1956), British violinist